Fragoso is a surname. Notable people with the surname include:

António Fragoso (1897–1918), Portuguese composer and pianist.
Daniel Fragoso (born 1982), Spanish footballer
Heleno Fragoso (1926–1985), Brazilian criminologist
Ignacio Fragoso (born 1968), Mexican long-distance runner
Javier Fragoso (1942–2014), Mexican former football player and manager
Juan de Matos Fragoso (c. 1608-1689?), Spanish dramatist
Margaux Fragoso (1979–2017), American memoirist
Thiago Fragoso (born 1981), Brazilian actor, voice actor and singer
Valdemar Gutiérrez Fragoso (born 1956), Mexican politician